Minzuhar Glacier is the 6.5 km long and 3 km wide glacier on Oscar II Coast, Graham Land in Antarctica situated southwest of Punchbowl Glacier and northeast of Jorum Glacier.  It is draining from the southeast slopes of Forbidden Plateau southeastwards between Metlichina Ridge and Yordanov Nunatak to flow into Borima Bay north of Furen Point.

The feature is named after the settlement of Minzuhar in southern Bulgaria.

Location
British mapping in 1974.

Maps
 Antarctic Digital Database (ADD). Scale 1:250000 topographic map of Antarctica. Scientific Committee on Antarctic Research (SCAR), 1993–2016.

References
 Minzuhar Glacier. SCAR Composite Antarctic Gazetteer.
 Bulgarian Antarctic Gazetteer. Antarctic Place-names Commission. (details in Bulgarian, basic data in English)

External links
 Minzuhar Glacier. Copernix satellite image

Glaciers of Oscar II Coast
Bulgaria and the Antarctic